Simona Brown (born 6 April 1994) is a British actress best known for her lead role in Behind Her Eyes.

Personal life
Simona Brown grew up in Peckham, London, and is of Jamaican heritage. She studied musical theatre  at the BRIT School in Croydon and studied acting at the Identity School of Acting in London.

Career
Brown has appeared in TV miniseries including as Gaia in The Casual Vacancy and as Grace in The Night Manager. She had a recurring role as Faith in HIM and as Roz in the 2016 British-American series Guilt. Her other TV roles include the 2016 remake of Roots and Murdered by My Boyfriend. She plays the main character Tess in the 2018 Channel 4/Netflix series Kiss Me First.

In August 2019, it was announced Brown had been cast in the role of Louise on the Netflix psychological thriller miniseries, Behind Her Eyes.

Filmography

Film

Television

References

External links

Living people
Black British actresses
English television actresses
21st-century English actresses
English people of Jamaican descent
1994 births
People from Peckham
Actresses from London